The following is a list of buildings at Eastern Michigan University in Ypsilanti, Michigan. EMU is home to many notable structures, including three high-rise residence halls and the multi-building Eastern Michigan University Historic District on the National Register of Historic Places. Today EMU is composed of more than 122 buildings across  of its academic and athletic campus.

The oldest remaining buildings on campus are Starkweather Hall and Welch Hall; the tallest buildings on campus are Hoyt, Hill, and Pittman Halls (collectively known as the Towers).

Campus

The university was founded in 1849 and started as Michigan State Normal School. In 1899, it became the Michigan State Normal College when it created the first four-year curriculum for a normal college in the nation. None of the original buildings from the Michigan State Normal School have survived, as many of the buildings were wood frame and did not age well. In 1914, Pease Auditorium was built making it the campus' first auditorium. By 1939, residence halls were established allowing students to live on campus. With the addition of departments and the large educational enrollment after WWII, the school became Eastern Michigan College in 1956. The large enrollment boosted the number of buildings and residence halls on campus. Between 1900 and the 1950s, around 20 buildings were constructed on the present-day campus.

Today, the university is composed of an academic and athletic campus spread across , with 122 buildings. The EMU campus includes several buildings with sculpture by Corrado Parducci. The oldest remaining building on campus is Starkweather Hall, which opened in 1896, three days before Welch Hall.  The Ypsilanti Water Tower, built in 1889, while not strictly speaking part of the campus, does border EMU on two sides; the north side of the water tower faces Welch Hall across Cross Street, while the east side of the tower faces a campus parking lot (formerly the site of the EMU gymnasium) across Summit Street.  Hoyt, Hill, and Pittman Halls, are the tallest buildings in Ypsilanti by floor count; only the Ypsilanti Water Tower, standing 147 feet tall on the highest ground in Ypsilanti, stands taller.

Historic buildings

Eastern Michigan University's Historic District, comprising Welch, Starkweather, McKenny and Sherzer Halls, is on the National Register of Historic Places The district was established in 1984.

Pease Auditorium is listed on the National Register of Historic Places independently from the Historic District, receiving the designation in 1984.

Academic buildings
Many of EMU's colleges are housed in specific buildings. EMU's newest academic building is the Everett L. Marshall Building, EMU's first "green" building on campus. The building features extensive use of natural lighting and stair treads, furnishings, and furniture made of recycled materials.  Flooring throughout the building is made from recycled and renewable resources. Other significant buildings include Pray-Harrold; when built in 1969, it was one of the largest classroom buildings in the United States.

Administrative and student life buildings
EMU has several administrative buildings that also serve as student life locations. Bruce T. Halle Library houses one of the largest collections of children's literature in the United States. The building has as an automated retrieval system (the ARC) capable of housing 1 million items. While the most-used books are still on shelves, the majority of the school's books are stored within this system, which runs several stories underneath the library itself. Other buildings of historical significance include McKenny Union, Pierce Hall, Starkweather Hall, and Welch Hall. McKenny was the first student union on the campus of a teachers' college when it opened in 1931. Pierce Hall was dedicated as part of the centennial celebrations of the Normal College in 1949. The residents of Ypsilanti donated the money to construct the 120-foot tower; in June 1950, the school installed the Alumni Memorial Chimes, which were donated by the alumni and dedicated to those who died in World War II.
Starkweather Hall is the oldest building still standing on EMU's campus, and Welch Hall is the second oldest building on campus. In parts of Starkweather, the original doorknobs remain, bearing the initials "SCA" for the Student Christian Association, for whom the building was originally constructed. Starkweather Hall was placed on the National Register of Historic Places in 1977.

Dining
Eastern has two food courts, an all-you-care-to-eat cafeteria, a marketplace, seven cafes, and three convenience stores. The larger dining facilities on campus are geographically located near residence halls.

Athletic and recreation buildings

EMU has several athletic and recreation facilities used for various sporting events and entertainment events. The EMU Convocation Center hosts convocation, graduation, and concerts. In 2008, Bruce Springsteen performed at Oestrike Stadium in support of Barack Obama during his presidential campaign. "Big Bob's"Lake House hosts yearly events in University Park.

Residence halls and apartments
EMU has 12 on-campus residence halls, four on-campus apartment complexes, and two university-owned houses. Many residence halls were built after World War II and named after influential professors and EMU presidents.

Former buildings
Nine buildings that were once part of EMU's campus no longer stand. These buildings include the Old Main Building, The Conservatory, an unnamed wooden gymnasium, The Old Gymnasium, the Old Post Mansion, the Business and Finance Building and Goodison Hall, both designed by R.S. Gerganoff, and Pine Grove Terrace Apartments. Goodison was among the first residence halls built on Eastern Michigan’s campus.

The finance building went by various names such as the Health Center (from being built to 1961), the Frederick Alexander Music Building (1961–1984), and informally "Old Alex" after 1980. In 2005, Pine Grove Apartments were demolished to make room for the Student Center.

Notes

 
Eastern Michigan University buildings
Eastern Michigan University buildings